Anatoliy Yuriyovych Kokhanovskyi (born 5 October 1995) is a Ukrainian professional footballer who plays as a striker.

Career

FC Chernihiv
Anatoliy Kokhanovskyi started his career in Yunist Chernihiv in 2012. In 2017 he moved to FC Chernihiv where he won the Chernihiv Oblast Football Championship in 2018 and in 2019. In 2020 he was promoted with the team to the Ukrainian Second League. On 11 June 2021 he scored against Karpaty Lviv in the last match of the 2020–21 season.

Career statistics

Club

Honours
FC Chernihiv
 Chernihiv Oblast Football Championship: 2019

References

External links
Anatoliy Kokhanovskyi at FC Chernihiv 

1995 births
Living people
Footballers from Chernihiv
FC Chernihiv players
FC Yunist Chernihiv players
Ukrainian footballers
Ukrainian Second League players
Association football forwards